Jeff Henderson may refer to:

 Jeff Henderson (chef), American chef
 Jeff Henderson (athlete) (born 1989), American long jumper
 Jeff Henderson (musician), member of Upper Hutt Posse